Allen "Skip" Kenney was head coach of the men's swimming team at Stanford University from 1979 to 2012. In his 33-year dynasty, he coached his teams to Pac-10 Conference titles 31 years in a row, itself a conference record, and to 7 NCAA championships.
Kenney was named Pac-10 Coach of the Year 20 times and College Swimming Coaches Association of America (CSCAA) Coach of the Year 6 times. 
His teams included: 134 All-Americans, 72 NCAA champions, and 23 Olympic athletes.
During his tenure, his student-athletes had a 100% graduation rate.

Kenney also coached on the international circuit. He was appointed the men's coach for the U.S. team at the 2004 Short Course World Championships. He served as head coach of the United States Men's Swimming Team at the 1996 Summer Olympics in Atlanta and assistant coach at both the 1984 and 1988 Summer Olympic Games.

Kenney was inducted into the Stanford Hall of Fame, the Fresno Athletic Hall of Fame, the International Swimming Hall of Fame, and the ASCA Hall of Fame.

On March 9, 2007, Kenney was suspended indefinitely, with pay, by Stanford after admitting to removing entries for records set by five swimmers (Jason Plummer, Michael McLean, Tobias Oriwol, Rick Eddy, Peter Carothers) that he had disagreements with from the Stanford swimming team's media guide.  The team was coached, on an interim basis, by associate head coach Ted Knapp. On April 20, 2007, Stanford announced that Kenney would serve a 60-day suspension without pay and then return to his position as head coach. Kenney issued an apology to the Stanford community.

He said that he drew on his service in the Marine Corps in his coaching. "Whether you are racing or in combat, for you to be at your best, your mind takes over and your body follows. Your expectations rise."

References

External links

 

Living people
American swimming coaches
Stanford Cardinal swimming coaches
United States Marines
Year of birth missing (living people)